Ixalodectes flectocercus is a species of bush cricket endemic to Australia.

Sources

Tettigoniidae
Orthoptera of Australia
Critically endangered fauna of Australia
Critically endangered insects
Taxonomy articles created by Polbot
Insects described in 1985